The  are a Japanese women's softball team based in Takasaki, Gunma. The Solfille compete in the Japan Diamond Softball League (JD.League) as a member of the league's East Division.

History
The Solfille were founded in 1984, as Taiyo Yuden softball team.

The Japan Diamond Softball League (JD.League) was founded in 2022, and the Solfille became part of the new league as a member of the East Division.

Roster

References

External links
 
 Taiyo Yuden Solfille - JD.League

Japan Diamond Softball League
Women's softball teams in Japan
Sports teams in Gunma Prefecture